Macduff distillery is a single malt Scotch whisky distillery in Macduff in the Highland whisky producing area of Scotland.

History
The Macduff Distillery Company was founded in 1960. During its history, the distillery's official name has fluctuated between Glen Deveron and MacDuff with official bottlings mostly having been released under the former. In 1972, Glen Deveron/Macduff was acquired by William Lawson Distillers Ltd. (famous for a blend by the same name), which became part of the Martini & Rossi corporation in 1980. In 1992 the owners Martini & Rossi were acquired by the Bacardi Corporation. Bacardi put their subsidiary John Dewar & Sons in charge of the Macduff distillery. 

Dewar & Sons also control Royal Brackla, Aberfeldy, Aultmore, and Craigellachie.

External links

References 

Distilleries in Scotland
Scottish malt whisky